Arthur Greenslade (4 May 1923  – 27 November 2003) was a British conductor and arranger for films and television, as well as for a number of performers. He was most musically active in the 1960s and 1970s.

Greenslade was born in Northfleet, Kent.  In the 1950s, he was pianist and arranger with the Oscar Rabin Band. He arranged for Jack Jones, Chris Farlowe, Serge Gainsbourg, Genesis, Cat Stevens, Diana Ross, Dusty Springfield, the Bachelors and Kinderjazz. For Shirley Bassey, he arranged "Goldfinger" and "Send In the Clowns". He has conducted orchestras in the Hollywood Bowl and Carnegie Hall, and was Bassey's musical director. He was arranger and conductor on the Shirley Bassey albums And I Love You So Never Never Never Good, Bad but Beautiful Love, Life and Feelings and You Take My Heart Away
.
He also played the piano on the Kinks' first hit, "You Really Got Me".

With Andrew Loog Oldham he wrote "Headlines", the B-side of "Ride on Baby" (IM 038), by Chris Farlowe, which was released in 1966.

Greenslade also conducted some easy listening recordings. He conducted the orchestra for Rod McKuen's first television special, which aired on NBC in May 1969. He also arranged Ireland's 1973 Eurovision Song Contest entry, "Do I Dream", sung by Maxi. He arranged the 1969 hit single "Je T'Aime ... Moi Non Plus" by Serge Gainsbourg and Jane Birkin.

Greenslade died in 2003 at the age of 80, in Sydney, Australia.

References

1923 births
2003 deaths
British male conductors (music)
British composers
British jazz pianists
Easy listening musicians
People from Northfleet
20th-century British pianists
20th-century British conductors (music)
20th-century British male musicians
British male jazz musicians
Oscar Rabin Band members